The following are settlements on Christmas Island; there are no cities on the island.

 Drumsite
 Flying Fish Cove (largest settlement)
 Poon Saan 
 Silver City

Settlements